CD166 antigen is a 100-105 kD typeI transmembrane glycoprotein that is a member of the immunoglobulin superfamily of proteins. In humans it is encoded by the ALCAM gene. It is also called CD166 (cluster of differentiation 166), MEMD, SC-1/DM-GRASP/BEN in the chicken, and KG-CAM in the rat.

Some literature sources have also cited it as the CD6 ligand (CD6L). It is expressed on activated T cells, activated monocytes, epithelial cells, fibroblasts, neurons, melanoma cells, and also in sweat and sebaceous glands. CD166 protein expression is reported to be upregulated in a cell line deriving from a metastasizing melanoma. CD166 plays an important role in mediating adhesion interactions between thymic epithelial cells and CD6+ cells during intrathymic T cell development.

Recently, CD166 has also been used as a potential cancer stem cell marker.

References

Further reading

External links
 
 

Clusters of differentiation